The Royal Geographical Society's Gold Medal consists of two separate awards: the Founder's Medal 1830 and the Patron's Medal 1838. Together they form the most prestigious of the society's awards. They are given for "the encouragement and promotion of geographical science and discovery." Royal approval is required before an award can be made.

The awards originated as an annual gift of fifty guineas from King William IV, first made in 1831, "to constitute a premium for the encouragement and promotion of geographical science and discovery." The Royal Geographical Society decided in 1839 to change this monetary award into the two gold medals. Prior to 1902 the Patron's Medal was alternatively known as the "Victoria Medal".

Recipients include David Livingstone in 1855, Mary Somerville in 1869, Nain Singh Rawat in 1877, Ferdinand von Richthofen in 1878, Alfred Russel Wallace in 1892 and William Woodville Rockhill in 1893, to more recent winners including William Morris Davis in 1919, Sir Halford John Mackinder in 1945, Richard Chorley in 1987 and David Harvey in 1995.

Recipients (since 1970) 
Source: List of Past Gold Medal Winners by RGS

Recipients (1901–1970)

Recipients (1832–1900)

See also

 List of geography awards
 Gold medal awards

References

External links
 List of Past Gold Medal Winners by RGS  List of Past Gold Medal Winners

Awards of Royal Geographical Society